Construction Law is a monthly English-language journal providing news and articles on the construction industry. The journal is written for the non-legal professional involved in contractual and other legal matters in the industry. The journal is owned by LexisNexis which is part of Reed Elsevier.

Articles within the journal are written by lawyers, barristers, academics, insurance and health and safety specialists, who specialise in construction law.

Features
Construction Law offers six main feature length analysis articles per issue, written by construction lawyers, barristers and academics, as well as insurance and health and safety specialists. In addition, developments in adjudication, industry standard contract forms, key decisions from the courts, alternative forms of dispute resolution, and forthcoming legislation are covered.

The journal also includes the following regular sections:
 News section: reports on procurement and contractual as well as health and safety matters.
 Guest editor: specialist lawyers offer opinions on legal issues affecting the construction industry
 State of Play: a table tracking new and proposed legislation in the UK and EU
 Reports from the Courts, written by Michael Furmston, provides rulings from the Technology and Construction Court as well as results of appeals.
 Contracts Monitor on building contracts, including offerings from the Joint Contracts Tribunal
 Alternative Dispute Resolution is a regular examination of issues relating to non-litigious methods of dispute resolution.
 Book reviews

History
The journal was originally published by Construction Legal Press Ltd in April 1990. Eclipse Group Ltd then acquired the journal in 1991. It was sold to Butterworths Tolley in 2002 and through a series of mergers it became part of LexisNexis.

Nicholas Barrett, a specialist construction journalist, has been editor since 1994.

See also
 Corporate Rescue and Insolvency Journal
 Counsel
 Justice of the Peace
 Justice of the Peace Reports
 New Law Journal
 Tolley's Employment Law Newsletter

External links
 

British law journals
Monthly magazines published in the United Kingdom
Professional and trade magazines
Magazines established in 1990
LexisNexis academic journals
Magazines published in London
Construction law
1990 establishments in England
English-language journals